Tenement at Gdańska street 67 is a habitation house located at 67 Gdańska Street, in Bydgoszcz. It displays early forms of Modern architecture, with elements of Art Nouveau.

Location 

The building stands on the western side of Gdańska Street, between Cieszkowskiego and Świętojańska streets.

It is also close to remarkable historical tenements in the same street:
 Józef Święcicki tenement at 63;
 Eduard Schulz Tenement at 66/68;
 Alfred Schleusener Tenement at 62.

History

The house was built in 1910-1911, on a design by the architect Rudolf Kern, who also erected or redesigned other buildings in Gdańska Street:
 August Mentzel Tenement at 5;
 Tenement at 71 Gdańska street.

Initial address was 40 Danziger Straße, first registered landlord in 1910 was Carl Ernst, a butcher

In 1915, Hermann Boettcher purchased the building. Boettcher was a successful entrepreneur of metalworking initially established in the 1890s in Chodkiewicza Street.

In 1932, at the location of a cafe, Kresowa, Klement Kwaśniewski opened a patisserie and bakery specialized in cakes.
Other relatives had their office in the building: 
 Marta Kwaśniewska as a photographer;
 Ignacy Kwaśniewski  as a businessman.

Today, a pharmacy occupies the ground floor premises and a hotel is located in the backyard of the tenement.

Architecture
The building presents characteristics of the first decade of the 20th century with early forms of Modern architecture and elements of Art Nouveau.

The facade is richly decorated with:
 a portal entrance, with children figure and vegetal forms;
 round bay windows
 peacocks balcony bas-relief;
 friezes surrounding openings;
 third floor windows are enhanced by high quality Art Nouveau vegetal motifs;
 a large eyelid dormer crowns the frontage.
The building has been renovated in 2020.

Gallery

See also

 Bydgoszcz
 Gdanska Street in Bydgoszcz
 Rudolf Kern
  Downtown district in Bydgoszcz

References

External links
  Pharmacy at 67
  Hotel Kużnia

Bibliography 
  

Buildings and structures on Gdańska Street, Bydgoszcz
Residential buildings completed in 1911
Modernist architecture in Bydgoszcz